Stefano Molinari (born 26 August 2000) is an Italian professional footballer who plays as a centre back for  club Pro Patria.

Club career
Formed on Pro Patria youth system, Molinari made his first team debut on 24 November 2019 against Pistoiese. 

On 8 January 2019, he joined Serie D club Milano City on loan.

He scored his first goal for the club on 1 December 2019 against Renate.

References

External links
 
 

2000 births
Living people
Italian footballers
Association football defenders
Serie C players
Aurora Pro Patria 1919 players
Milano City F.C. players